Leucania commoides, the comma wainscot or two-lined wainscot moth, is a species of cutworm or dart moth in the family Noctuidae. It was described by Achille Guenée in 1852 and is found in North America.

The MONA or Hodges number for Leucania commoides is 10447.

References

 Lafontaine, J. Donald & Schmidt, B. Christian (2010). "Annotated check list of the Noctuoidea (Insecta, Lepidoptera) of North America north of Mexico". ZooKeys, vol. 40, 1-239.

Further reading

 Arnett, Ross H. (2000). American Insects: A Handbook of the Insects of America North of Mexico. CRC Press.

External links

 Butterflies and Moths of North America
 NCBI Taxonomy Browser, Leucania commoides

Leucania
Moths described in 1852